HMS H49 was a British H-class submarine built by William Beardmore and Company, Dalmuir. She was launched on 15 July 1919 and commissioned on 25 October 1919. The submarine saw active service in the Second World War, but was sunk off the Netherlands by German patrol vessels on 18 October 1940.

Design

H49 was fitted with an anti-aircraft gun and four  torpedo tubes. Its torpedo tubes were fitted to the bows and the submarine was loaded with eight 21-inch torpedoes. It is a Holland 602 type submarine but was designed to meet Royal Navy specifications. Its complement was twenty-two crew members.

Construction and service
H49 was laid down at William Beardmore and Company's Dalmuir shipyard on 21 January 1918, was launched on 15 July 1919 and completed on 25 October 1919.

Following commissioning, H49 joined the submarine training school at Portland. She remained part of this establishment in December 1920.

In March 1937 the submarine navigated the Gloucester and Sharpness Canal in the company of the submarine . The trip had been arranged by Lieutenant A.F Collett, the 1st Lieutenant of H33. She was reduced to reserve at Portsmouth on 16 December 1938.

H49 survived until the Second World War, when she was assigned with other H-class submarines to a training flotilla at Harwich. Following  the fall of France in June 1940, these training submarines undertook operational patrols in the North Sea as an anti-invasion precaution. On 16 September 1940, H49 commanded by Lieutenant M A Langley, fired four torpedoes at a large enemy coastal convoy and sank a 2,189-ton ship; Langley was later awarded the Distinguished Service Cross for this action. On 1 October, the submarine fired four torpedoes at a six-ship convoy, but without success.

On the afternoon of 18 October, under the command of Lieutenant R E Coltart DSC, H49 was on her "billet" (prescribed patrol area) off the Dutch coast, when the unusual decision was taken to surface in daylight, probably presuming that the poor visibility would prevent their being sighted. However, they had not detected a nearby group of five German armed trawlers or Vorpostenboote of the 11th Anti-Submarine Flotilla, who attacked immediately. Despite diving at once, H49 was sunk by depth charges from the German patrol craft UJ111, UJ116 and UJ118, commanded by Lieutenant-Commander Wolfgang Kaden aboard UJ116, off Texel, the Netherlands. There was only one survivor, Leading Stoker George William Oliver from Hartlepool. He was rescued by German trawlers and spent the rest of the war as a prisoner of war at Marlag M. Following the loss of H49, operational patrols by the other H-class submarines were suspended, and the flotilla moved to Rosyth in December 1940 to resume training duties.

In the mid-1980s amateur divers who had violated H49s war grave status were prosecuted by the Dutch government. Following research by Dennis Feary, the son of one of H49s lost crew members, he arranged for a memorial plaque to the submarine to be placed in St Mary's Church, Shotley in 2019, and a display dedicated to the sinking at the Aeronautical and War Museum on Texel Island.

See also
 List of submarines of the Second World War

References

Bibliography
 
 
 
 
 
 
 

 

British H-class submarines
Ships built on the River Clyde
1919 ships
World War II submarines of the United Kingdom
Lost submarines of the United Kingdom
World War II shipwrecks in the North Sea
Royal Navy ship names
Maritime incidents in October 1940
Submarines sunk by German warships